Matt Simpson may refer to:

 Matt Simpson (poet) (1936–2009), British poet and literary critic
 Matt Simpson (beer judge), American expert on craft beer and brewing
 Matt Simpson (racing driver) (born 1981), British racing driver
 Matt Simpson (goalball) (born 1990), American goalball player
 Matt Simpson (New York politician), member of the New York State Assembly from the 114th district
 Matt Simpson (Alabama politician), member of the Alabama House of Representatives

See also
 Matthew Simpson (1811-1884), American bishop of the Methodist Episcopal Church
 Matthew Simpson (footballer) (born 1967), Australian rules footballer